The following outline is provided as an overview of and topical guide to the U.S. state of Colorado:

Colorado – 22nd most populous, the eighth most extensive, and the highest in average elevation of the 50 United States.  Colorado is one of the western Mountain States. The 30 highest major summits of the Rocky Mountains all rise within Colorado.  The Territory of Colorado joined the Union as the 38th state on August 1, 1876.

General reference 

 Names
 Common name: Colorado
 Pronunciation: 
 Official name: State of Colorado
 Abbreviations and name codes
 Postal symbol:  CO
 ISO 3166-2 code: US-CO
 Internet second-level domain: .co.us
 Nicknames
Buffalo Plains State (in disuse)
Centennial State (previously used on license plates)
Colorful Colorado (previously used on license plates)
Columbine State
Highest State
Lead State (in disuse)
Mother of Rivers
Rocky Mountain Empire
Rocky Mountain State 
Silver State (in disuse; see Nevada)
Switzerland of America
 Adjectival: Colorado
 Demonyms
 Coloradan
 Coloradoan (archaic)

Geography of Colorado 

Geography of Colorado
 Colorado is: a U.S. state, a federal state of the United States of America
 Location
 Northern Hemisphere
 Western Hemisphere
 Americas
 North America
 Anglo America
 Northern America
 United States of America
 Contiguous United States
 Western United States
 Mountain West United States
 Southwestern United States
 Population of Colorado: 5,029,196 (2010 U.S. Census)
 Population density of Colorado: 18.39 km−2 (estimate for 2008)
 Area of Colorado: 268,657.7 km2
 Atlas of Colorado

Places in Colorado 

Places in Colorado
Colorado municipalities
Colorado census designated places
List of cities and towns in Colorado
Colorado counties
 Historic places in Colorado
 Forts in Colorado
 Ghost towns in Colorado
 National Historic Landmarks in Colorado
 National Register of Historic Places listings in Colorado
 Bridges on the National Register of Historic Places in Colorado
National parks in Colorado
State parks in Colorado
National Natural Landmarks in Colorado

Environment of Colorado 

 Climate of Colorado
 Protected areas in Colorado
 State forests of Colorado
 Superfund sites in Colorado
 Wildlife of Colorado
 Fauna of Colorado
 Birds of Colorado
 Mammals of Colorado
 Reptiles
 Snakes of Colorado

Natural geographic features of Colorado 

 List of lakes in Colorado
 List of mountains of Colorado
 Mountain ranges of Colorado
 Mountain peaks of Colorado
The 100 highest major summits of Colorado
The 55 major 4000 meter summits of Colorado – major peaks over 13,123.4 feet elevation
The 51 Colorado fourteeners – peaks over 14,000 feet elevation
The 50 most prominent summits of Colorado
The 40 most isolated major summits of Colorado
 Mountain passes of Colorado
 List of rivers of Colorado
 Drainage basins of Colorado
National Natural Landmarks in Colorado

Man-made geographic features of Colorado 
 List of dams and reservoirs in Colorado

Regions of Colorado 

 Central Colorado
 South-Central Colorado
 Colorado Eastern Plains
 Colorado Mineral Belt
 Colorado Piedmont
 Colorado Plateau
 Colorado Western Slope
 Front Range Urban Corridor
 Denver Region
 North Front Range Region
 Pikes Peak Region
 Grand Valley
 High Plains
 High Rockies
 Northern Colorado
 Roaring Fork Valley
 Rocky Mountains
 Southern Rocky Mountains
 Elk Mountains
 Ruby Range
 West Elk Mountains
 Flat Tops
 Front Range
 Indian Peaks
 Kenosha Mountains
 Longs Peak Massif
 Mummy Range
 Never Summer Mountains
 Pikes Peak Massif
 Platte River Mountains
 Rampart Range
 South Park Hills
 South Williams Fork Mountains
 Tarryall Mountains
 Gore Range
 Grand Mesa
 Laramie Mountains
 Massifs (large mountain masses)
 Mount Elbert Massif – highest summit of the Rocky Mountains
 Mount Massive Massif – second highest summit of the Rocky Mountains
 Sierra Blanca Massif – fifth highest summit of the Rocky Mountains
 Longs Peak Massif – 13th highest major summit of the Rocky Mountains
 Pikes Peak Massif – 20th highest major summit of the Rocky Mountains
 Medicine Bow Mountains
 Mosquito Range
 Tenmile Range
 Park Range
 Elkhead Mountains
 Parks (large mountain basins)
 Middle Park
 North Park
 San Luis Valley
 South Park
 Rabbit Ears Range
 Raton Mesa
 San Juan Mountains
 La Garita Mountains
 Cochetopa Hills
 La Plata Mountains
 Needle Mountains
 Grenadier Range
 West Needle Mountains
 San Miguel Mountains
 Sneffels Range
 Sangre de Cristo Mountains
 Culebra Range
 Sangre de Cristo Range
 Crestones
Sierra Blanca Massif
 Spanish Peaks
 Wet Mountains
 Sawatch Range
 Collegiate Peaks
 Mount Elbert Massif
 Mount Massive Massif
 Williams Mountains
 Uncompaghre Plateau
 White River Plateau
 Western Rocky Mountains
 Uinta Mountains
 Colorado Plateau
 Ute Mountain
 Western Colorado
 Northwestern Colorado
 Southwestern Colorado

Administrative divisions of Colorado 

The 64 counties of the state of Colorado
There are no township governments in the state of Colorado.

Demography of Colorado 

Demographics of Colorado
Colorado census designated places
Colorado census statistical areas
Colorado counties
Colorado metropolitan areas
Colorado municipalities
Front Range Urban Corridor

Government and politics of Colorado 

Politics of Colorado

Federal government in Colorado
United States congressional delegations from Colorado
List of United States senators from Colorado
U.S. Senate Class II
John Hickenlooper
U.S. Senate Class III
Michael Bennet
List of United States representatives from Colorado
Congressional districts of the State of Colorado
Colorado's 1st congressional district
Diana DeGette
Colorado's 2nd congressional district
Joe Neguse
Colorado's 3rd congressional district
Lauren Boebert
Colorado's 4th congressional district
Ken Buck
Colorado's 5th congressional district
Doug Lamborn
Colorado's 6th congressional district
Jason Crow
Colorado's 7th congressional district
Brittany Pettersen
Colorado's 8th congressional district
Yadira Caraveo

Military in Colorado 

 Colorado Air National Guard
 Colorado Army National Guard
 Military facilities in Colorado

State government of Colorado 

Government of Colorado
 Form of government: U.S. state government
 Colorado State Capitol

Executive branch of the government of Colorado 
Governor of the State of Colorado website Jared Polis
Colorado Department of Agriculture (CDA) website
Colorado Department of Corrections (CDOC) website
Colorado Department of Education (CDE) website
Colorado Department of Health Care Policy and Financing (CDHCPF) website
Colorado Department of Higher Education (CDHE) website
Colorado Department of Human Services (CDHS) website
Colorado Department of Labor and Employment (CDLE) website
Colorado Department of Local Affairs (DOLA) website
Colorado Department of Military and Veterans Affairs (DMVA) website
Colorado Air National Guard website
Colorado Army National Guard website
Colorado Department of Natural Resources (CDNR) website
Colorado Division of Forestry website
Colorado State Parks website 
Colorado Department of Personnel and Administration (DPA) website
Colorado Department of Public Health and Environment (CDPHE) website
Colorado Department of Public Safety (CDPS) website
Colorado Department of Regulatory Agencies (DORA) website
Colorado Public Utilities Commission (CPUC) website
Colorado Department of Revenue (DOR) website
Colorado Department of Transportation (CDOT) website
Lieutenant Governor of the State of Colorado website Barbara O'Brien
Secretary of the State of Colorado website Bernie Buescher
Colorado Department of State (DOS) website
Attorney General of the State of Colorado website John W. Suthers
Colorado Department of Law (CDOL) website
Treasurer of the State of Colorado website Cary Kennedy
Colorado Department of Treasury (CDT) website

Legislative branch of the government of Colorado 

 Colorado General Assembly (bicameral)
 Upper house: Colorado Senate
 Lower house: Colorado House of Representatives

Judicial branch of the government of Colorado 

Courts of Colorado
 Supreme Court of Colorado

Law and order in Colorado 

Law of Colorado
 Cannabis in Colorado
 Capital punishment in Colorado
 Individuals executed in Colorado
 Constitution of Colorado
 Crime in Colorado
 Gun laws in Colorado
 Law enforcement in Colorado
 Law enforcement agencies in Colorado
 Colorado State Patrol
 Same-sex marriage in Colorado

Local government in Colorado 
64 counties.
272 municipalities.
No township governments in Colorado.
More than 4,000 special districts:  see Active Colorado Local Governments

Elections and politics in Colorado
 Elections in Colorado
 Electoral reform in Colorado
 Political party strength in Colorado

History of Colorado 

History of Colorado

History of Colorado, by period 

Timeline of Colorado history

Prehistory of Colorado
Indigenous peoples
Spanish colony of Santa Fé de Nuevo Méjico, 1598–1821
Domínguez–Escalante expedition, 1776
Spanish cavalry arrests U.S. Army Pike Expedition in San Luis Valley, 1807
Adams–Onís Treaty of 1819
Treaty of Córdoba of 1821
French colony of Louisiane east of Continental Divide and San Luis Valley, 1699–1764
Treaty of Fontainebleau of 1762
Spanish (though predominantly Francophone) district of Alta Luisiana east of Continental Divide and San Luis Valley, 1764–1803
Third Treaty of San Ildefonso of 1800
French district of Haute-Louisiane east of Continental Divide and San Luis Valley, 1803
Louisiana Purchase of 1803
Unorganized U.S. territory created by the Louisiana Purchase east of Continental Divide and San Luis Valley, 1803–1804
District of Louisiana east of Continental Divide and San Luis Valley, 1804–1805
Territory of Louisiana east of Continental Divide and San Luis Valley, 1805–1812
U.S. Army Pike Expedition, 1806–1807
Territory of Missouri east of Continental Divide and San Luis Valley, 1812–1821
Mexican territory of Santa Fé de Nuevo México south or west of Arkansas River, 1821–1846
Unorganized U.S. territory north and east of Arkansas River, 1821–1854
Santa Fe Trail, 1821–1880
Bent's Old Fort, 1833–1849
Treaty of Fort Laramie of 1851
Territorial claims of the Republic of Texas between the Arkansas River and the Rio Grande and extending north between 106°10'42"W and 107°23'33"W, 1836–1845
Mexican–American War, April 25, 1846 – February 2, 1848
Treaty of Guadalupe Hidalgo, February 2, 1848
State of Deseret (extralegal), 1849–1850
Territory of New Mexico (1850–1861)–1912
Hispanic settlers from Taos found village of San Luis in the San Luis Valley, April 9, 1851
Territory of Utah (1850–1861)–1896
Territory of Kansas, 1854–1861
Territory of Nebraska (1854–1861)–1867
Pike's Peak Gold Rush, 1858–1861
Territory of Jefferson (extralegal), 1859–1861
Pony Express, 1860–1861
Territory of Colorado, 1861–1876
American Civil War, April 12, 1861 – May 13, 1865
Colorado in the American Civil War
Battle of Glorieta Pass, March 26–28, 1862
Colorado War, 1863–1865
Sand Creek massacre, November 29, 1864
Union Pacific Railroad arrives at Julesburg on June 24, 1867
Comanche Campaign, 1868–1874
Battle of Beecher Island, 1868
Powell Geographic Expedition of 1869
Denver Pacific Railway arrives at Denver on June 24, 1870
Kansas Pacific Railway arrives at Denver on August 15, 1870
Denver and Rio Grande Railroad arrives at Pueblo on June 15, 1872
Hayden Survey of Colorado, 1873–1876
State of Colorado becomes 38th state admitted to the United States of America on August 1, 1876
Colorado Silver Boom, 1879–1893
Alpine Tunnel on the Denver, South Park and Pacific Railroad opened to rail traffic on July 13, 1882
Denver and Rio Grande Railroad arrives at Silverton on July 15, 1882
Collapse of Colorado mining, 1893–1917
Panic of 1893
Sherman Silver Purchase Act repealed on November 1, 1893
Colorado (male) voters approve suffrage for women on November 7, 1893
Colorado Labor Wars, labor dispute, 1903–1904
Mesa Verde National Park established on June 29, 1906
Democratic National Convention in Denver nominates William Jennings Bryan for President of the United States, July 9, 1908
Ludlow Massacre, labor dispute, April 20, 1914
Rocky Mountain National Park established on January 26, 1915
Columbine Mine massacre, labor dispute, November 21, 1927
Moffat Tunnel on the Denver and Salt Lake Railroad opens to rail traffic on February 26, 1928
First ski lift in Colorado opens at Berthoud Pass on February 7, 1937
Lowry Field, 1938–1994
Winter Park Ski Area opens December 1939
World War II, September 1, 1939 – September 2, 1945
United States enters Second World War on December 8, 1941
Fort Carson, since January 31, 1942
Rocky Mountain Arsenal, June 30, 1942 – October 9, 1992
Pueblo Chemical Depot, since 1942
Granada War Relocation Center, August 1942 – October 15, 1945
Rocky Flats Plant, 1952–1992
Aspen Mountain Ski Area opens on December 14, 1946
United States Air Force Academy dedicated July 11, 1955
Bent's Old Fort National Historic Site designated on June 3, 1960
Colorado voters reject the XII Olympic Winter Games on November 7, 1972
Mesa Verde National Park designated a UNESCO World Heritage Site on September 8, 1978
Denver International Airport opens February 28, 1995
Group of Eight meets in Denver on June 20–22, 1997
Black Canyon of the Gunnison National Park designated on October 21, 1999
Great Sand Dunes National Park and Preserve designated on September 13, 2004
Sand Creek Massacre National Historic Site designated on April 27, 2007
Democratic National Convention in Denver nominates Barack Obama for President of the United States, August 27, 2008

History of Colorado, by region

State
History of Colorado
A brief history of Colorado
History of Santa Fé de Nuevo Méjico, Nueva España, 1598–1821
History of La Louisiane, Nouvelle-France 1682–1764
History of Luisiana, Nueva España, 1764–1803
History of La Louisiane 1803–1803
History of the Louisiana Purchase, 1803–1804
History of the District of Louisiana, 1804–1805
History of the Territory of Louisiana, 1805–1812
History of the Territory of Missouri, 1812–1821
History of Santa Fe de Nuevo México, México, 1821–1850
History of the extralegal Territory of Deseret, 1849–1850
History of the Territory of New Mexico 1850–(1861)
History of the Territory of Utah 1850–(1861)
History of the Territory of Kansas 1854–1861
History of the Territory of Nebraska 1854–(1861)
History of the extralegal Territory of Jefferson 1859–1861
History of the Governor of the Territory of Jefferson
History of the Territory of Colorado 1861–1876
History of the Governors of the Territory of Colorado
History of the State of Colorado 1876–
History of the Governors of the State of Colorado

Regions
History of the Colorado Eastern Plains
History of the Colorado Plateau
History of the South Park

Counties
History of the counties of Colorado
History of Adams County, Colorado
History of Alamosa County, Colorado
History of Arapahoe County, Colorado
History of Arapahoe County, Kansas Territory 1855–1861
History of Archuleta County, Colorado
History of Arrappahoe County, Jefferson Territory 1859–1861
History of Baca County, Colorado
History of Beaver County, Utah Territory 1856–(1861)
History of Bent County, Colorado
History of Boulder County, Colorado
History of Broderick County, Kansas Territory 1859–1861
History of Carbonate County, Colorado 1879–1879
History of Chaffee County, Colorado
History of Cheyenne County, Jefferson Territory 1859–1861
History of Cheyenne County, Colorado
History of Clear Creek County, Colorado
History of Conejos County, Colorado
History of Costilla County, Colorado
History of Crowley County, Colorado
History of Custer County, Colorado
History of Delta County, Colorado
History of Dolores County, Colorado
History of Douglas County, Colorado
History of Eagle County, Colorado
History of El Paso County, Colorado
History of El Paso County, Jefferson Territory 1859–1861
History of El Paso County, Kansas Territory 1859–1861
History of Elbert County, Colorado
History of Fountain County, Jefferson Territory 1859–1861
History of Fremont County, Kansas Territory 1859–1861
History of Grand County, Colorado
History of Greenwood County, Colorado Territory 1870–1874
History of Green River County, Utah Territory 1852–1857 and 1859–(1861)
History of Guadalupe County, Colorado Territory 1861–1861
History of Heele County, Jefferson Territory 1859–1861
History of Iron County, Utah Territory 1852–(1861)
History of Jackson County, Colorado
History of Jackson County, Jefferson Territory 1859–1861
History of Jefferson County, Colorado
History of Jefferson County, Jefferson Territory 1859–1861
History of Kiowa County, Colorado
History of Kit Carson County, Colorado
History of Lake County, Colorado
History of Larimer County, Colorado
History of Larimer County, Colorado (book)
History of Moffat County, Colorado
History of Montana County, Kansas Territory 1859–1861
History of Montezuma County, Colorado
History of Mora County, New Mexico Territory 1860–(1861)
History of Mountain County, Jefferson Territory 1859–1861
History of North County, Jefferson Territory 1859–1861
History of Oro County, Kansas Territory 1859–1861
History of Ouray County, Colorado
History of Park County, Jefferson Territory 1859–1861
History of Peketon County, Kansas Territory 1859–1861
History of Platte County, Colorado Territory 1872–1874
History of Routt County, Colorado
History of Saint Vrain County, Jefferson Territory 1859–1861
History of Great Salt Lake County, Utah Territory 1852–(1861)
History of San Juan County, Colorado
History of San Miguel County, Colorado
History of Sanpete County, Utah Territory 1852–(1861)
History of Saratoga County, Jefferson Territory 1859–1861
History of South Arapahoe County, Colorado 1902–1903
History of Summit County, Colorado
History of Taos County, New Mexico Territory 1852–(1861)
History of Teller County, Colorado
History of Uncompaghre County, Colorado 1883–1883
History of Utah County, Utah Territory 1852–(1861)
History of Washington County, Utah Territory 1852–(1861)
History of Weld County, Colorado

Places
History of Acres Green, Colorado	
History of Adams City, Colorado	
History of Agate, Colorado	
History of Almont, Colorado	
History of Amherst, Colorado	
History of Animas Forks, Colorado	
History of Anton, Colorado	
History of Arapahoe, Colorado	
History of Arapahoe, Colorado (ghost town)	
History of Arlington, Colorado	
History of Arvada, Colorado	
History of Ashcroft, Colorado	
History of Aspen, Colorado	
History of Ault, Colorado	
History of Aurora, Colorado	
History of Avon, Colorado	
History of Badito, Colorado	
History of Bailey, Colorado	
History of Beaver Creek, Colorado	
History of Bedrock, Colorado	
History of Bellvue, Colorado	
History of Bent's Old Fort, Colorado
History of Berthoud, Colorado	
History of Beulah, Colorado	
History of Black Hawk, Colorado	
History of Boncarbo, Colorado	
History of Boulder, Colorado	
History of Bovina, Colorado	
History of Bow Mar, Colorado	
History of Brandon, Colorado	
History of Breckenridge, Colorado	
History of Briggsdale, Colorado	
History of Bristol, Colorado	
History of Broomfield, Colorado	
History of Brush, Colorado	
History of Buckskin Joe, Colorado	
History of Buffalo Creek, Colorado	
History of Burlington, Colorado	
History of Burns, Colorado	
History of Cahone, Colorado	
History of Camp Carson, Colorado
History of Camp Collins, Colorado	
History of Cañon City, Colorado	
History of Capulin, Colorado	
History of Carbondale, Colorado	
History of Caribou, Colorado	
History of Carr, Colorado	
History of Cascade, Colorado	
History of Castle Pines North, Colorado	
History of Castle Pines Village, Colorado	
History of Castle Rock, Colorado	
History of Cedaredge, Colorado	
History of Centennial, Colorado	
History of Central City, Colorado	
History of Chama, Colorado	
History of the Cherry Creek Diggings, Kansas Territory
History of Chivington, Colorado	
History of Climax, Colorado	
History of Colfax, Colorado	
History of Colorado City, Colorado	
History of Colorado Springs, Colorado	
History of Commerce City, Colorado	
History of Commerce Town, Colorado	
History of Conifer, Colorado	
History of Craig, Colorado	
History of Creede, Colorado	
History of Crested Butte, Colorado	
History of Crestone, Colorado	
History of Cripple Creek, Colorado	
History of Crystal, Colorado	
History of Dakan, Colorado	
History of De Beque, Colorado	
History of Deer Trail, Colorado	
History of Denver, Colorado
A brief history of Denver
History of the Alamo Placita neighborhood in Denver
History of the Athmar Park neighborhood in Denver
History of the Auraria neighborhood in Denver
History of the Baker neighborhood in Denver
History of the Barnum neighborhood in Denver
History of the Belcaro neighborhood in Denver
History of the City Park in Denver
History of the Civic Center in Denver
History of the Elyria-Swansea neighborhood in Denver
History of the Five Points neighborhood in Denver
History of the Globeville neighborhood in Denver
History of the Golden Triangle neighborhood in Denver
History of the Highland neighborhood in Denver
History of the Jefferson Park neighborhood in Denver
History of the LoDo neighborhood in Denver
History of the Park Hill neighborhood in Denver
History of the Villa Park neighborhood in Denver
History of the Washington Park neighborhood in Denver
History of the West Colfax neighborhood in Denver
History of Defiance, Colorado	
History of Divide, Colorado	
History of Durango, Colorado	
History of Dyersville, Colorado	
History of Elizabeth, Colorado	
History of Englewood, Colorado	
History of Eureka, Colorado	
History of Evergreen, Colorado	
History of Falcon, Colorado	
History of Fletcher, Colorado	
History of Fort Carson, Colorado
History of Fort Collins, Colorado	
History of Fort Garland, Colorado
History of Fort Lyon, Colorado
History of Fort Saint Vrain, Colorado
History of Fort Vasquez, Colorado
History of Fort Wise, Colorado
History of Fountain, Colorado	
History of Franktown, Colorado	
History of Fruita, Colorado	
History of Garden City, Colorado	
History of Garibaldi, Colorado	
History of Georgetown, Colorado	
History of Gilman, Colorado	
History of Glenwood Springs, Colorado	
History of Gold Hill, Colorado	
History of Golden, Colorado	
History of Gould, Colorado	
History of Greeley, Colorado	
History of Gunnison, Colorado	
History of Hartman, Colorado	
History of Hayden, Colorado	
History of Henderson Island, Colorado	
History of Highlands Ranch, Colorado	
History of Holly, Colorado	
History of Homelake, Colorado	
History of Hot Sulphur Springs, Colorado	
History of Idaho Springs, Colorado	
History of Idledale, Colorado	
History of Johnstown, Colorado	
History of Keota, Colorado	
History of Kersey, Colorado	
History of Kittredge, Colorado	
History of Kremmling, Colorado	
History of La Veta, Colorado	
History of Lafayette, Colorado	
History of Lake George, Colorado	
History of Laporte, Colorado	
History of Leadville, Colorado	
History of the Little Dry Creek Diggings, Kansas Territory
History of Longmont, Colorado	
History of Loveland, Colorado	
History of Lyons, Colorado	
History of Manassa, Colorado	
History of Mancos, Colorado	
History of Manhattan, Colorado	
History of Marble, Colorado	
History of Mead, Colorado	
History of Meeker, Colorado	
History of Minturn, Colorado	
History of Moffat, Colorado	
History of Montezuma, Colorado	
History of Montrose, Colorado	
History of Morrison, Colorado	
History of Mountain View, Colorado	
History of Nathrop, Colorado	
History of Nevadaville, Colorado	
History of Orchard City, Colorado	
History of Oro City, Colorado	
History of Ouray, Colorado	
History of Palmer Lake, Colorado	
History of Paonia, Colorado	
History of Pingree Park, Colorado	
History of Placerville, Colorado	
History of Platteville, Colorado	
History of Pueblo, Colorado	
History of Raymer, Colorado	
History of Redstone, Colorado	
History of Reunion, Colorado	
History of Ridgway, Colorado	
History of Rosita, Colorado	
History of Russell Gulch, Colorado	
History of Saint Elmo, Colorado	
History of Serene, Colorado	
History of Silver Cliff, Colorado	
History of Silverthorne, Colorado	
History of Snowmass Village, Colorado	
History of Steamboat Springs, Colorado	
History of Sterling, Colorado	
History of Superior, Colorado	
History of Telluride, Colorado	
History of Thornton, Colorado	
History of Timnath, Colorado	
History of Tincup, Colorado	
History of Vail, Colorado	
History of Victor, Colorado	
History of Villa Grove, Colorado	
History of Walsenburg, Colorado	
History of Ward, Colorado	
History of Waverly, Colorado	
History of Wellington, Colorado	
History of Westminster, Colorado	
History of Wheat Ridge, Colorado	
History of Winter Park, Colorado

History of Colorado, by subject 
History of architecture in Colorado:
History of the Bears Stadium in Denver
History of the Beaumont Hotel in Ouray
History of the Broadmoor World Arena in Colorado Springs
History of the Cathedral Basilica of the Immaculate Conception in Denver
History of the Cathedral of the Sacred Heart in Pueblo
History of the Chautauqua Auditorium in Boulder
History of the Citadel Mall in Colorado Springs
History of the Colorado Convention Center in Denver
History of the Colorado Governor's Mansion in Denver
History of the Colorado Springs Airport
History of the Denver Art Museum
History of the Denver City Cable Railway Building
History of the Denver Federal Center
History of the Denver International Airport
History of the Denver Millennium Bridge
History of the Denver Municipal Airport
History of the Fox Theatre in Boulder
History of the Georgetown Loop
History of the Hotel Colorado in Glenwood Springs
History of the Invesco Field at Mile High in Denver
History of the McNichols Sports Arena in Denver
History of the Midway House in Aspen Park
History of the Mile High Stadium in Denver
History of the Mousetrap in Denver
History of the Paramount Theatre in Denver
History of the Pepsi Center in Denver
History of the Regency in Denver
History of the Stapleton International Airport in Denver
History of the Twenty Ninth Street Development in Boulder
History of the Union Station in Denver
History of commerce in Colorado:
History of Colorado Railcar
History of the Colorado Central Railroad
History of the Colorado Midland Railway
History of the Colorado Springs and Cripple Creek District Railway
History of the Denver and Rio Grande Western Railroad
History of the Denver and Salt Lake Railway
History of the Denver Pacific Railway and Telegraph Company
History of the Denver, South Park and Pacific Railroad
History of the Gulf, Colorado and Santa Fe Railway
History of the counties of Colorado
History of education in Colorado:
History of schools in Colorado:
History of the Arapahoe High School
History of the Bear Creek High School
History of the Brighton High School
History of the Central High School in Pueblo, Colorado
History of the Clear Creek High School
History of the Colorado Academy
History of the Colorado Rocky Mountain School
History of the Colorado Springs School
History of the Colorado's Finest Alternative High School
History of the Coronado High School
History of the Denver Academy
History of the Denver Montclair International School
History of the Denver School of the Arts
History of the Douglas County High School
History of the East High School in Denver
History of the Englewood High School
History of the Evergreen High School
History of the Fossil Ridge High School
History of the George Washington High School in Denver
History of the Grandview High School
History of the Heritage Christian Academy
History of the Highland High School
History of the Holy Family High School
History of the Horizon High School
History of the Littleton High School
History of the Monarch High School
History of the Pomona High School
History of the Saint Mary's High School
History of the Skyline High School
History of the South High School in Denver
History of the Thornton High School
History of the school districts of Colorado:
History of the Aurora Public Schools
History of the Colorado Springs School District 11
History of the Denver Public Schools
History of the Jefferson County Public Schools
History of higher education in Colorado:
History of the Adams State University 1921–
History of the Agricultural College of Colorado 1879–1935
History of the Colorado Agricultural and Mechanical College 1944–1957
History of the Colorado Christian College 1985–1989
History of the Colorado Christian University 1914–
History of the Colorado College 1874–
History of the Colorado College of Agricultural and Mechanic Arts 1935–1944
History of the Colorado Community College System 1967–
History of the Colorado Heights University 1989–
History of the Colorado State College 1957–1970
History of the Colorado State College of Education 1935–1957
History of the Colorado State Normal School 1890–1911
History of the Colorado State Normal School for Children 1901–1923
History of the Colorado State Teachers College 1911–1935
History of the Colorado State University 1879–
History of the Colorado State University-Pueblo 1993–
History of the Colorado Technical University 1965–
History of the Colorado Women's College 1909–1867 and 1973–1982
History of the Denver Bible College 1945–1949
History of the Denver Bible Institute 1914–1945
History of the Fort Lewis College 1933–
History of the Loretto Heights College 1891–1988
History of the Metropolitan State College of Denver 1965–
History of the Teikyo Loretto Heights University 1989–2009
History of the Temple Buell College 1967–1973
History of the Rockmont College 1949–1985
History of the Pueblo Junior College 1937–1961
History of the Southern Colorado Junior College 1993–1937
History of the Southern Colorado State College 1961–1975
History of the United States Air Force Academy 1955–
History of the University of Colorado at Boulder 1876–
History of the University of Colorado Engineering Management Program 1987–
History of the University of Colorado School of Law 1892–
History of the University of Colorado at Colorado Springs 1965–
History of the University of Colorado Denver 1912–
History of the University of Colorado Denver School of Dental Medicine 1922–
History of the University of Colorado Health Sciences Center 1979–2004
History of the University of Northern Colorado 1890–
History of the University of Southern Colorado 1975–2003
History of the Western Colorado Community College 2006–
History of the Western Colorado University 1901–
History of the Western State College of Colorado 1923–2012
History of federal facilities in Colorado
History of the Bent's Old Fort National Historic Site
History of the Black Canyon of the Gunnison National Park
History of the Browns Park National Wildlife Refuge
History of the Canyons of the Ancients National Monument
History of the Cathedral of Saint John in the Wilderness in Denver
History of the Collegiate Peaks Wilderness
History of the Colorado National Monument
History of the United States Mint at Denver
History of the Dinosaur National Monument
History of the Gold Belt National Scenic and Historic Byway
History of the Great Sand Dunes National Park and Preserve
History of the Hovenweep National Monument
History of the Indian Peaks Wilderness
History of the James Peak Wilderness
History of the McInnis Canyons National Conservation Area
History of the Mesa Verde National Park and World Heritage Site
History of the Monte Vista National Wildlife Refuge
History of the Rocky Flats National Wildlife Refuge
History of the Rocky Mountain Arsenal National Wildlife Refuge
History of the Rocky Mountain National Park
History of the Sand Creek Massacre National Historic Site
History of the Spanish Peaks Wilderness
History of the Two Ponds National Wildlife Refuge
History of the Yucca House National Monument
History of marriage in Colorado
History of the military in Colorado:
History of the Air Force Space Command (AFSPC) 1982–
History of Camp Carson 1942–1954
History of Camp Collins 1858–1864
History of Camp Hale 1942–1964
History of Camp George West 1903–
History of Cheyenne Mountain Air Force Station 1966–2006
History of the Colorado Air National Guard 1923–
History of the Colorado Army National Guard 1860–
History of the 1st Regiment of Colorado Volunteers 1861–1862
History of Ent Air Force Base 1951–1976
History of Falcon Air Force Base 1985–1998
History of Fitzsimons Army Medical Center 	1918–1999
History of Fort Carson 1942–
History of Fort Collins 1864–1872
History of Fort Garland 1858–1883
History of Fort Lyon 1862–1897
History of Fort Wise 1860–1862
History of Lowry Air Force Base 1938–1994
History of the North American Aerospace Defense Command (NORAD) 1958–
History of Peterson Air Force Base 1942–
History of the Pueblo Chemical Depot 1942–
History of the Pueblo Chemical Agent-Destruction Pilot Plant
History of the Rocky Mountain Arsenal 1942–1992
History of Schriever Air Force Base 1985–
History of the United States Air Force Academy 1955–
History of the United States Northern Command (NORTHCOM) 2002–
History of the municipalities of Colorado
History of newspapers in Colorado:
History of the Boulder Daily Camera
History of the Camera of Boulder, Colorado
History of the Colorado Springs Gazette-Telegraph
History of the Colorado Springs Independent
History of the Daily Camera of Boulder, Colorado
History of The Denver Post
History of The Gazette of Colorado Springs, Colorado
History of the Rocky Mountain News
History of religion in Colorado
History of the Calvary Episcopal Church in Golden, Colorado
History of the Cathedral Basilica of the Immaculate Conception in Denver
History of the Cathedral of the Sacred Heart in Pueblo, Colorado
History of the Church of Jesus Christ of Latter-day Saints in Colorado
History of the Colorado Community Church
History of the Grace Episcopal Church in Georgetown, Colorado
History of the New Life Church in Colorado Springs, Colorado
History of the Roman Catholic Archdiocese of Denver
History of the Saint Mark Coptic Orthodox Church in Centennial, Colorado
History of sports in Colorado
History of the Colorado Avalanche hockey club
History of the Colorado Cricket League
History of the Colorado Crush arena football club
History of the Colorado Rapids soccer football club
History of the Colorado Rapids U23's
History of the Colorado Rockies baseball club
History of the Colorado Silver Bullets baseball club
History of the Denver Barbarians rugby football club
History of the Denver Dynamite arena football club
History of the Denver Gold football club
History of the Real Colorado Foxes soccer football club
History of the University of Colorado sports teams
History of the University of Colorado football team
History of the state parks of Colorado
History of the Bonny Lake State Park, Colorado
History of the Pearl Lake State Park, Colorado
History of the Lake Pueblo State Park, Colorado
History of the Eldorado Canyon State Park, Colorado
History of transportation in Colorado:
History of roads in Colorado:
History of the Colorado State Highway 67
History of the Colorado State Highway 470
History of the Colorado State Patrol 1935–
History of the Colorado T-REX Project (TRansportation EXpansion) 2001–2006
History of the Dinosaur Diamond Scenic and Historic Byway
History of the Interstate Highway 25 in Colorado
History of the Interstate Highway 70 in Colorado
History of the Lariat Loop Scenic and Historic Byway
History of the Mousetrap in Denver
History of the Old Spanish Trail
History of the Pony Express 1860–1861
History of the Santa Fe Trail
History of the Trail Ridge Road
History of the TransAmerica Trail Bicycle Route 1976–
History of railroads in Colorado:
History of the California Limited passenger train 1892–1954
History of the California Zephyr passenger train 1949–1970 and 1983–
History of the Chief passenger train 1926–1968
History of the City of Denver passenger train 1936–1971
History of the Colorado and Southern Railway 1898–1981
History of the Colorado Central Railroad 1868–1890
History of the Colorado Midland Railway 1883–1918
History of the Colorado Springs and Cripple Creek District Railway 1899–1920
History of the Denver and Rio Grande Western Railroad 1870–1988
History of the Denver and Salt Lake Railway 1902–1947
History of the Denver International Airport Automated Guideway Transit System 1995–
History of the Denver Pacific Railway and Telegraph Company 1867–1880
History of the Denver, South Park and Pacific Railroad 1872–1889
History of the Denver Union Station 1881–
History of the Denver Zephyr passenger train 1934–1972
History of the Florence and Cripple Creek Railroad 1893–1920
History of the Georgetown Loop 1884–1938 and 1984–
History of the Gilpin Railroad 1887–1917
History of the Gulf, Colorado and Santa Fe Railway 1873–1965
History of the narrow gauge railroads in Colorado 1871–
History of the Rio Grande Ski Train passenger train 1940–2009
History of the Rio Grande Southern Railroad 1890–1951
History of the Rio Grande Zephyr passenger train 1971–1983
History of the Southwest Chief passenger train 1984–
History of the Southwest Limited passenger train 1974–1984
History of the Super Chief passenger train 1936–1971
History of the Texas Zephyr passenger train 1940–1967
History of the Uintah Railway 1902–1939
History of aviation in Colorado:
History of aircraft and aviators in Colorado:
CAF Rocky Mountain Wing Museum, Grand Junction, Colorado
Colorado Aviation Hall of Fame, Denver
Colorado Aviation Historical Society, Denver
Peterson Air and Space Museum, Colorado Springs, Colorado
Pueblo Historical Aircraft Society, Pueblo, Colorado
Pueblo Weisbrod Aircraft Museum (combined Weisbrod and B-24 International Museums)
Spirit of Flight Center, Lafayette, Colorado
Vintage Aero Flying Museum, Hudson, Colorado
Wings Over the Rockies Air and Space Museum, Denver
History of airports in Colorado:
History of the Colorado Springs Airport 1927–
History of the Denver International Airport 1995–
History of the Denver Municipal Airport, 1929–1944
History of the Stapleton International Airport 1944–1995
List of airports in Colorado
History of the United States congressional districts of Colorado
History of the Colorado 1st congressional district
History of the Colorado 2nd congressional district
History of the Colorado 3rd congressional district
History of the Colorado 4th congressional district
History of the Colorado 5th congressional district
History of the Colorado 6th congressional district
History of the Colorado 7th congressional district
History of the Colorado At-large congressional district
History of United States Navy ships named for Colorado:
History of USS Colorado 1858–1876
History of USS Denver (C-14/PG-28/CL-16) 1904–1931
History of USS Colorado (ACR-7) 1905–1916
History of USS Pueblo (CA-7) 1916–1927
History of USS Colorado (BB-45) 1923–1947
History of USS Denver (CL-58) 1942–1947
History of USS Pueblo (PF-13) 1944–1946
History of USS Boulder Victory (AK-227) 1944–1946
History of USS Montrose (APA-212) 1944–1969
History of USS Pitkin County (LST-1082) 1945–1971
History of USS Pueblo (AGER-2) 1967–captured by North Korea 1968
History of USS Denver (LPD-9) 1968–
History of USS Boulder (LST-1190) 1971–1994
History of waterways in Colorado
History of the Cherry Creek in Colorado
History of the Clear Creek in Colorado
History of the Colorado River
History of the Ralston Creek in Colorado
 List of territorial claims and designations in Colorado
 Uranium mining in Colorado

Culture of Colorado 

Culture of Colorado
 Museums in Colorado
 Religion in Colorado
 Episcopal Diocese of Colorado
 Cathedral of St. John in the Wilderness, Denver
 Focus on the Family
 Rocky Mountain District (LCMS)
 Roman Catholic Archdiocese of Denver
 Cathedral Basilica of the Immaculate Conception
 Roman Catholic Diocese of Colorado Springs
 Roman Catholic Diocese of Pueblo
 Cathedral of the Sacred Heart in Pueblo
 The Church of Jesus Christ of Latter-day Saints in Colorado
 Denver Colorado Temple
 Scouting in Colorado
 State symbols of Colorado
 Flag of the State of Colorado 
 Great Seal of the State of Colorado 
 Colorado state bird
 Colorado state fish
 Colorado state folk dance
 Colorado state fossil
 Colorado state gemstone
 Colorado state grass
 Colorado state insect
 Colorado state mammal
 Colorado state mineral
 Colorado state motto
 Colorado state nickname
 Colorado state reptile
 Colorado state slogan
 Colorado state soil
 first Colorado state song
 second Colorado state song
 Colorado state stone
 Colorado state tartan
 Colorado state tree

The arts in Colorado 

 Music of Colorado
 Theater in Colorado

Sports in Colorado 

Sports in Colorado
 Professional sports teams in Colorado

Economy and infrastructure of Colorado 

Economy of Colorado
 Communications in Colorado
 Newspapers in Colorado
 Radio stations in Colorado
 Telephone service in Colorado
 Telephone Area Codes: 303, 719, 720, 970
 Television stations in Colorado
 Energy in Colorado
 List of power stations in Colorado
 Solar power in Colorado
 Wind power in Colorado
 Health care in Colorado
 Hospitals in Colorado
 Mining in Colorado
 Coal mining in Colorado
 Gold mining in Colorado
 Silver mining in Colorado
 Uranium mining in Colorado
 Transportation in Colorado
 Airports in Colorado
 Roads in Colorado
 Interstate Highways in Colorado
 U.S. Highways in Colorado
 State highways in Colorado
 List of Colorado Scenic and Historic Byways
 Water in Colorado

Education in Colorado 

Education in Colorado
 Schools in Colorado
 Colorado public school districts
 Colorado charter schools
 Colleges and universities in Colorado
 Adams State College
 Aims Community College
 Arapahoe Community College
 Art Institute of Colorado
 Belleview College
 Colorado Christian University
 Colorado College
 Colorado Mesa University
 Colorado Mountain College
 Colorado Northwestern Community College
 Colorado School of Mines
 Colorado State University System
 Colorado State University
 Colorado State University-Pueblo
 Colorado Technical University
 Community College of Aurora
 Community College of Denver
 Denver Seminary
 DeVry University
 Fort Lewis College
 Front Range Community College
 Greendale Community College
 Heritage College & Heritage Institute
 Iliff School of Theology
 Johnson & Wales University
 Jones International University
 Lamar Community College
 Lincoln College of Technology
 Metropolitan State University of Denver
 Morgan Community College
 Naropa University
 National Technological University
 Nazarene Bible College
 Northeastern Junior College
 Otero College
 Pikes Peak State College
 Pueblo Community College
 Red Rocks Community College
 Redstone College
 Regis University
 Rocky Mountain College of Art and Design
 Rocky Vista University College of Osteopathic Medicine
 Trinidad State College
 United States Air Force Academy
 University of Colorado System
 University of Colorado at Boulder
 University of Colorado at Colorado Springs
 University of Colorado Denver
 Anschutz Medical Campus
 Auraria Campus
 University of Denver
 University of Northern Colorado
 Western State College
 High schools in Colorado
 Parochial schools in Colorado
 Private schools in Colorado

See also

Colorado
Outline of Colorado
Index of Colorado-related articles
Bibliography of Colorado
Climate change in Colorado
Colorado statistical areas
Front Range Urban Corridor
North Central Colorado Urban Area
South Central Colorado Urban Area
Geography of Colorado
Geology of Colorado
History of Colorado
List of territorial claims and designations in Colorado
National Register of Historic Places listings in Colorado
Prehistory of Colorado
Timeline of Colorado history
List of cities and towns in Colorado
List of adjectivals and demonyms for Colorado cities
List of census-designated places in Colorado
List of city nicknames in Colorado
List of Colorado municipalities by county
Commons:Category:Cities in Colorado
List of counties in Colorado
Commons:Category:Counties of Colorado
List of forts in Colorado
List of ghost towns in Colorado
List of places in Colorado
Paleontology in Colorado

References

External links

Colorado state government website
Colorado information
Colorado state government
Colorado state agencies
Colorado counties
Colorado municipalities
Colorado special districts
Colorado tourism

Colorado

Colorado
Colorado